Avalanche Spire is a mountain in the Alaska Range found directly south of Denali. It is very technical due to its steep slopes.

References

Alaska Range
Mountains of Alaska
Mountains of Matanuska-Susitna Borough, Alaska